Deborah Coates is an American author.  She grew up in western New York, and currently lives in Ames, Iowa.  Her stories have been included in Strange Horizons, SCIFICTION, Best American Fantasy 2008, Year's Best Fantasy 6, and Best Paranormal Romance.

Bibliography

Novels
 Wide Open (March 13, 2012)
 Deep Down (March 5, 2013)
 Strange Country (May 27, 2014)

Short stories
 What Makes a River (2010) Tor
 A Wish for a Yak (Alphabet Series, Volume I, Book 15)
 Cowgirls in Space (2009) Asimov's Science Fiction, April–May 2009
 How to Hide Your Heart (2008) Strange Horizons, 21 January 2008
 The Whale's Lover (2008) Asimov's Science Fiction, January 2008
 Articles of a Personal Nature (2007)
 Chainsaw on Hand (2007)
 46  Directions, None of Them North (2006) Asimov's Science Fiction, March 2006
 Magic In a Certain Slant Of Light (2005) Strange Horizons Fiction
 I Am the Noise of Silence (1999) The Age of Reason: Stories For a New Millennium
 The Queen of Mars (1998) Between the Darkness and the Fire: 23 Tales of Imaginative Fiction from the Internet
 Tally (1997) The Magazine of Fantasy & Science Fiction, May 1997
 Flyboy (1995) A Starfarer's Dozen: Stories of Things to Come
 Girls Who Never Stood a Chance (2019) The Magazine of Fantasy & Science Fiction, July/August 2019

References

External links

Living people
Year of birth missing (living people)
21st-century American novelists
American fantasy writers
American women short story writers
American women novelists
Women science fiction and fantasy writers
21st-century American women writers
21st-century American short story writers
Novelists from New York (state)